Macrosoma coscoja is moth-like butterfly described by Paul Dognin in 1900. It belongs to the family Hedylidae. Originally it belonged to the genus Phellinodes. Malcolm J. Scoble combined it with Macrosoma in 1986.

Distribution
The species is found in eastern Colombia, eastern central and south Ecuador, central to southeastern Peru to eastern Bolivia.

Description

Wings
M. coscoja has wings of the grey-brown ground colour. The apex of the forewing is weakly emarginate and dark brown in colour. Small white mark(s) either is present or entirely absent at the proximal edge of dark apical patch. Postmedially, a narrow white streak edged with brown is found on the inner side. Unlikely the female, the male of this species are lacks with small glassy patch at base of hindwing.
The length of the forewing is 18–20 mm.

Genitalia

Male
Following are the characteristics of the male genitalia:
 Saccus is fairly short. 
 Gnathos with the medial component is tongue-shaped, downcurved and without denticles. 
 Lateral angles is with denticles. 
 Valva is broad medially, narrows to finger-like projection.

Female
The female genitalia has the following features:
 Anal papillae is fairly pointed. 
 Ductus bursae broadens gradually into corpus bursae. 
 Signum is denticulate.

Antenna
The antenna is not bipectinate in both sexes.

Diagnosis
M. coscoja is similar to M. albistria, M. bahiata, M. uniformis, and M. amaculata. The presence of the narrow postmedial streak distinguishes M. coscoja from these species, as does the shape of the Gnathos and Valva.

References
 Macrosoma coscoja - Overview - Encyclopedia of Life.
 Catalogue of Life.
 A catalogue of the Hedylidae (Lepidoptera: Hedyloidea), with descriptions of two new species.
  An identification guide to the Hedylidae (Lepidoptera: Hedyloidea).

Sources

Hedylidae
Butterflies described in 1900
Hedylidae of South America
Taxa named by Paul Dognin